Donald Scott Howson (born April 9, 1960) is a Canadian ice hockey executive and former player. He was formerly the general manager of the Columbus Blue Jackets of the National Hockey League (NHL). He played 18 games in the NHL with the New York Islanders between the 1984–85 and 1985–86 seasons. The rest of his playing career, which lasted from 1981 to 1986, was spent in the minor leagues. He later turned to coaching and managing, working for several years in the American Hockey League before moving to the NHL.

In July 2020, he took over as president and chief executive officer of the American Hockey League.

Playing career
As a youth, Howson played in the 1973 Quebec International Pee-Wee Hockey Tournament with a minor ice hockey team from Thornhill, Ontario.

Howson played two seasons with the Kingston Canadians of the Ontario Hockey Association, and one more season with the club after they moved to the Ontario Hockey League. In that season, Howson amassed 57 goals, and 140 points in 66 games. That was second in team scoring to Bernie Nicholls, and sixth in league scoring.

Howson would then go on to play one season (1981–82) with the Toledo Goaldiggers of the IHL. He won the Garry F. Longman Memorial Trophy as IHL rookie of the year after scoring 55 goals and 120 points in only 74 games.

Howson played 146 games over three seasons with the Indianapolis Checkers of the Central Hockey League. It was after his time with the Checkers that Howson split two seasons between the New York Islanders, and their American Hockey League affiliate, the Springfield Indians. He played eight games in the 1984–85 season, and another 10 in the 1985–86 season. In the total 18 games, he had 5 goals, 3 assists, and 8 points.

Post-playing career
Howson holds a bachelor's degree from York University and is a graduate of York's Osgoode Hall Law School. After retiring from playing, he practiced law before joining the Edmonton Oilers organization in 1994 as general manager of their AHL affiliates, the Cape Breton Oilers and later the Hamilton Bulldogs. When Glen Sather left the Oilers for the New York Rangers and the Oilers hired Kevin Lowe, Lowe immediately promoted Howson to the Oilers where he served as assistant general manager from 2002 to 2007. Howson's AHL clubs reached the Calder Cup Finals in 1997 and 2003, and he served on the AHL's board of governors.

On June 15, 2007, Howson was named general manager of the Columbus Blue Jackets, and he guided the franchise to its first Stanley Cup Playoff appearance in 2009. He was relieved of his duties on February 12, 2013.

On March 12, 2013, Howson was hired by the Edmonton Oilers as a professional scout. On April 15, 2013, the Oilers named him the senior vice president of hockey operations. When Peter Chiarelli was hired as the Oilers' general manager in 2015, Howson's role was changed to vice president of player personnel.

On February 14, 2020, Howson was elected president and chief executive officer of the American Hockey League, effective July 1, 2020.

Career statistics

Regular season and playoffs

References

External links
 

1960 births
Living people
Canadian ice hockey centres
Columbus Blue Jackets executives
Edmonton Oilers executives
Edmonton Oilers scouts
Indianapolis Checkers (CHL) players
Kingston Canadians players
National Hockey League general managers
New York Islanders players
Ice hockey people from Toronto
Springfield Indians players
Toledo Goaldiggers players
Undrafted National Hockey League players